The Thomistic Institute is an academic institute of the Pontifical Faculty of the Immaculate Conception at the Dominican House of Studies, a Catholic pontifical faculty run by the Order of Preachers (Dominicans) located in Washington, D.C. Founded in 2009, its name derives from the order's heritage of Thomas Aquinas, as the institute is influenced by the Thomistic tradition. The institute was originally founded as an academic research institute of the Pontifical Faculty, but evolved into a network of campus chapters at universities throughout the United States, England, and Ireland that sponsors lectures on theology, philosophy, ethics, and politics. , the institute had chapters at around 60 universities. Counted among its past speakers are Scottish philosophers Alasdair MacIntyre and John Haldane, French philosopher Remi Brague, American philosopher Robert Sokolowski, English philosopher Sir Roger Scruton, Australian philosopher Mark Johnston, the Theologian of the Pontifical Household Wojciech Giertych, and United States Supreme Court Justice Neil Gorsuch.  In addition to individual lectures, the Institute has co-sponsored academic conferences with Harvard Law School, Yale University, New York University, Georgetown University, and Notre Dame University, among others.  It also organizes an annual conference on Thomistic philosophy at Mt. St. Mary's College in Newburgh, New York and an annual Thomistic Philosophy and Natural Science conference for faculty and graduate students in the experimental sciences and in philosophy, held in Washington, D.C.

Directors 
List of directors of the institute in chronological order:

 Rev. Thomas Joseph White, O.P. (2009–2018)
 Rev. Dominic Legge, O.P. (2018–present)

Thomistic Institute at the University of Notre Dame 
The Thomistic Institute at the University of Notre Dame was (between the 1990s and early 2000s) an annual summer conference that brought specialists in the philosophy of Thomas Aquinas and Christian philosophy to the campus of Notre Dame. Organized by Ralph McInerny, professor of philosophy at Notre Dame, these were funded by the Saint Gerard Foundation and the Strake Foundation.

References

External links 
 

Catholic organizations established in the 21st century
Catholic educational institutions
2009 establishments in Washington, D.C.
Christian organizations established in 2009